Oussama Zamouri (born 18 February 1996) is a Moroccan professional footballer who plays as a winger.

Club career
He made his professional debut in the Eerste Divisie for Telstar on 8 August 2016 in a game against RKC Waalwijk.

On 2 September 2019 he signed for Oxford United. He left Oxford four months later, having made one appearance in the EFL Trophy. He then continued his career in Croatia with NK Inter Zaprešić, where he made eleven appearances.

In July 2020, Zamouri signed with MVV Maastricht.

Career statistics

References

External links
 

Living people
1996 births
Moroccan footballers
People from Souss-Massa
Association football midfielders
SC Telstar players
FC Dordrecht players
Oxford United F.C. players
NK Inter Zaprešić players
MVV Maastricht players
Eerste Divisie players
Croatian Football League players
Moroccan expatriate footballers
Expatriate footballers in the Netherlands
Moroccan expatriate sportspeople in the Netherlands
Expatriate footballers in England
Moroccan expatriate sportspeople in England
Expatriate footballers in Croatia
Moroccan expatriate sportspeople in Croatia
Almere City FC players
AFC DWS players
SBV Vitesse players
FC Utrecht players